Chad Channing (born January 31, 1967) is an American musician who is best known as the drummer of the grunge band Nirvana from 1988 until 1990, during which time they recorded and released their debut album Bleach; he also appears on "Polly" in the follow-up album Nevermind. He currently sings and plays bass in the band Before Cars.

Biography

Early life
Channing was born on January 31, 1967, in Santa Rosa, California, to Wayne and Burnyce Channing. Wayne was a radio disc jockey and the family was constantly moving all over the country due to different jobs being offered to him. At 13, Chad shattered his femur in an accident during gym class. Over the years of rehabilitation and surgeries, he discovered music; he started playing music with a bass guitar that his parents bought him. The bass filled Chad's time as he was unable to go to school. When he was out of his leg casts, his parents bought him a drum set to help build strength in his legs.

Channing joined a band with future Nirvana guitarist Jason Everman called Stonecrow in 1985. Later, while working as a sauté cook on Bainbridge Island, Washington, Channing started the band Tick-Dolly-Row with Chris Karr, John Hurd and Ben Shepherd, also a Bainbridge Islander, who would later become the bassist for Soundgarden. Tick-Dolly-Row shared a bill with Nirvana, who at the time were going under the name Bliss. Not long after, a mutual friend introduced Channing to Kurt Cobain and Krist Novoselic, who were searching for a drummer. The three got together several times for jam sessions before they started playing shows.

Nirvana
In June 1988, a few weeks after Channing joined Nirvana, they recorded their first single "Love Buzz", also marking their Sub Pop debut. Nirvana began the recording sessions for Bleach on Christmas Eve 1988, finishing toward the end of January 1989. Jason Everman, a friend of the band, agreed to pay the money for recording costs. Everman had known Channing since fifth grade, and the two had played in bands together in high school.

Bleach was released on June 15, 1989. Channing played drums on the entire album with the exception of "Floyd the Barber" and "Paper Cuts" which featured drummer Dale Crover from a recording session prior to Channing joining the band. The 1992 re-release of Bleach included the song "Downer", which also had Crover on drums from the same recording session prior to Channing joining the band. In April 1990, Nirvana recorded eight songs at Smart Studios with producer Butch Vig for the band's sophomore album, although the session was not completed due to Cobain losing his voice. During the sessions, Cobain and Novoselic became disenchanted with Channing's drumming, and Channing expressed frustration at not being actively involved in songwriting. These creative and artistic differences culminated in Channing's departure after their April-May 1990 tour, a mutual decision within the band. Nirvana used the Smart Studios recordings as a demo to secure a new contract with a major label and the band re-recorded the tracks for a new studio album in the fall of 1990, recruiting Dave Grohl as their new drummer who adopted many of Channing's drum parts. Although uncredited (until the Deluxe edition), the version of "Polly" used on Nevermind is the original version the band recorded with Channing on percussion, the only song carried over from the previous session.

Due to popularity and longevity, the rehashing of older work by Nirvana continued, both during the band's existence and following their demise. The 1992 compilation, Incesticide, featured the tracks "Big Long Now", "Stain" and "Dive", which all credited Channing as drummer. Live versions of "Polly" and "Breed" that included Channing appeared on From the Muddy Banks of the Wishkah, a live album released in 1996. The 2004 With the Lights Out box set featured a DVD of a December 1988 Nirvana rehearsal, as well as seven songs scattered across the first two discs of the set, all with Channing on drums.

Following Nirvana's induction into the Rock and Roll Hall of Fame in December 2013, Channing said in an interview with the Radio.com website that he perceived the recognition as a gift for his daughter. However, Channing was later informed of his omission via text message, and was not included in the April 2014 induction, as the accolade only applied to Cobain, Novoselic and Grohl. Channing did attend the ceremony, and his replacement Dave Grohl made a point to publicly thank Channing for his contributions to the band and noted that some of Nirvana's most recognizable drum riffs In Bloom were, in fact, written by Channing.

Post-Nirvana work
After leaving Nirvana, Channing formed the Fire Ants who released the Stripped EP on Dekema Records in 1992, produced by Jack Endino, who had produced Bleach. Members of the Fire Ants included Brian Wood (vocals) and Kevin Wood (guitars), brothers of the late Mother Love Bone singer Andrew Wood, and bassist Dan McDonald. Channing and McDonald collaborated again in 1998 with John Hurd and Erik Spicer, forming The Methodists who released the album Cookie.

Chad stepped from behind the drum set to front his new project Before Cars, which released the single "Old Chair" in 2006. They released their debut album Walk Back in 2008, again produced by Jack Endino. Channing supplies lead vocals and bass on all tracks as well as some acoustic guitar.

Discography

With Tic Dolly Row
 Live demo (1987)

With Nirvana

With Fire Ants
 Ant Acid 7" (1992)
 Stripped EP (1992)

With The Methodists
 Cookie (1998)

With Before Cars
 Old Chair EP (2006)
 Walk Back (2008)
 How We Run (2013)

References

External links
East of the Equator's website
Official MySpace for Chad Channing and Before Cars
Red Band MySpace
Dekema Records (released Fire Ants EP "Stripped")
Fire Ants MySpace
The Methodists MySpace

1967 births
Living people
Musicians from Bainbridge Island, Washington
Musicians from Santa Rosa, California
Nirvana (band) members
Sub Pop artists
Grunge musicians
20th-century American drummers
American male drummers